Pseudogaurax is a genus of parasitic chloropid flies in the family Chloropidae. There are at least 4 described species in Pseudogaurax.

Species
Pseudogaurax anchora (Loew, 1866)
Pseudogaurax floridensis Sabrosky, 1950
Pseudogaurax paratolmos (Wheeler, 2016)
Pseudogaurax signatus (Loew, 1876)

References

Further reading

External links

 Diptera.info

Oscinellinae
Taxa named by John Russell Malloch